Eremobates pallipes is a species of windscorpion in the family Eremobatidae. It is known to occur in western North America, from Arizona to Canada.

References

Solifugae
Articles created by Qbugbot
Animals described in 1823